Annevoie Castle is a château in the village of Annevoie-Rouillon located in Wallonia in the municipality of Anhée, province of Namur, Belgium.

It was built in the 18th century by the Montpellier family, and is principally known for the extensive water gardens that surround it, the Jardins d'Annevoie, the only ones of their kind in Belgium. The design is basically French, but contains numerous English and Italian elements. The water is from the River Rouillon.

See also
List of castles in Belgium
 List of protected heritage sites in Anhée

External links

Commune d’Anhée website 
Seigneurie d'Annevoie website 
Gardens of Annnevoie 
Article on the Jardins d'Annevoie 

Gardens in Belgium
Castles in Belgium
Castles in Namur (province)
Anhée